Speyside single malts are single malt Scotch whiskies, distilled in Strathspey, the area around the River Spey in Moray and Badenoch and Strathspey, in northeastern Scotland.

The two best-selling single malt whiskies in the world, The Glenlivet and Glenfiddich, come from Speyside. Strathspey has the greatest number of distilleries of any of the whisky-producing areas of Scotland. Dufftown alone has six working distilleries with an annual capacity of 40.4 million litres of spirit.

Legal status

Speyside is a "protected region" for Scotch Whisky distilling under UK Government legislation. According to Visit Scotland, this region includes the area between the Highlands to the west, Aberdeenshire in the east and extending north to the Cairngorms National Park.

Distilleries

Illicit distilleries were common in the 1800s, but eventually, licences became available after the passing of the 1823 Excise Act. George Smith was the first licensee in Speyside, in 1824, and his small operation at Upper Drumin in the Glen Livet valley eventually grew into the massive Glenlivet enterprise.

Today, the major distilleries in the region are owned by leading international drinks groups including Diageo, LVMH and Pernod Ricard, by family-owned companies including J. & G. Grant and William Grant & Sons and by The Edrington Group (majority-owned by a charitable trust).

Roughly 50 percent of Scotland's whisky is made here in the approximately 50 distilleries located in this region. According to one source, the top five are The Macallan, Glenfiddich, Aberlour, Glenfarclas and Balvenie.

This dry, warm, region is a natural for whisky distillers because it is close to barley farms, contains the River Spey and is close to the Atlantic port of Garmouth. The water in the area is said to have "the lowest level of dissolved minerals" of any area in Scotland, and that may affect the taste of its whiskies. Another report explains that "quartzite at the source keeps high levels of minerals from mixing with the water".

The Visit Scotland website indicates that the region's whiskies have a fruity nature "ranging from ripe pears to sultanas" and some exhibit "sweet, caramel and fruity notes". Another review states that the use of peat is not common here, so many of the whiskies are not "smoky"; the article concluded that "typically, most Speyside whisky is fruity, sweet, and nutty, featuring notes of apple, honey, vanilla, and spice".

Benefits to the region 
In addition to providing jobs and income for barley farmers and distillery employees in the region, whisky production has helped improve tourism. Hotels and others with tourism businesses then benefit. All regions of that produce Scotch Whisky benefit, of course; the Scotch Whisky Association estimated in 2019 that whisky tourism in Scotland generates  £68.3 million per year. The Association also stated that the industry supported 40,000 jobs and accounted for over £4 billion in exports for Scotland; the specific benefits for Speyside were not provided.

The region hosts an annual whisky festival known as "Spirit of Speyside".

Scotland's Malt Whisky Trail is a tourism initiative featuring seven working Speyside distilleries, a historic distillery (Dallas Dhu, now a museum) and the Speyside Cooperage. A 2012 BBC article recommends a leisurely tour, taking a day or two at each distillery to appreciate the local "traditions and lore". In 2017, tourism in the Moray Speyside area increased significantly, by 50,000 visitors, primarily because of the appeal of the Malt Whisky Trail in the region. A Trail rep stated (in summer 2019) that 60% of tourists to Speyside visit at least one distillery. 

In addition to those on the Trail, some other distilleries also have visitor centres.

List of Speyside distilleries

 Aberlour
 Allt-A-Bhainne
 Auchroisk
 Aultmore
 Balmenach
 Balvenie
 BenRiach
 Benrinnes
 Benromach
 Braeval
 Cardhu
 Cragganmore
 Craigellachie
 Dailuaine
 Dalmunach
 Dalwhinnie
 Dufftown
 Glen Elgin
 Glen Grant
 Glen Keith
 Glen Moray
 Glen Spey
 Glenallachie
 Glenburgie
 Glendullan
 Glenfarclas
 Glenfiddich
 Glenlivet
 Glenlossie
 Glenrothes
 Glentauchers
 Inchgower
 Kininvie
 Knockando
 Knockdhu
 Linkwood
 Longmorn
 Macallan
 Mannochmore
 Miltonduff
 Mortlach
 Roseisle
 Speyburn
 Speyside
 Strathisla
 Strathmill
 Tamdhu
 Tamnavulin
 Tomintoul
 Tormore

Closed Speyside distilleries

 Caperdonich distillery
 Coleburn distillery
 Convalmore distillery
 Dallas Dhu distillery (open as a museum)
 Imperial distillery
 Parkmore distillery
 Pittyvaich distillery

Other brands
In addition to those single malts sold under the distilleries' names, brands associated with Speyside include Allt-á-Bhainne, Casg Annamh, Glen Turner, Lismore, McClelland's Single Malt, and Tlàth.

See also

 List of whisky brands
 List of whisky distilleries in Scotland
 Spirit of Speyside Whisky Festival

References

Further reading

External links
 GreaterSpeyside.com - all things Speyside
Interactive map of Speyside distilleries which are open to the public
Speyside Cooperage
 Speyside Distillery Online Guide

Economy of Highland (council area)
Economy of Moray
Scottish malt whisky